Bistro Agnes was a French restaurant in Portland, Oregon, in the United States. Owned by chefs Greg Denton and Gabrielle Quiñónez Denton, the bistro opened in January 2018 and garnered a positive reception. The Oregonian and the Portland Mercury included Bistro Agnes in lists of the city's best news restaurants, and Condé Nast Traveler included the restaurant in a list of Portland's 21 best. After closing temporarily during the COVID-19 pandemic, the couple confirmed plans to close permanently in January 2022.

Description 
Described as a "classic Paris bistro" and a "French comfort food spot", Bistro Agnes operated at the intersection of Southwest 12th Avenue and Alder Street in downtown Portland's West End. The interior featured blue walls, brass railings, mirrors, and vintage French posters. Eater Portland's Tim Forster called the restaurant a "French-style brasserie with classics like cassoulet and chicken liver mousse, and some American crossovers such as a cheeseburger with Bordelais sauce". The menu included French cuisine such as mussels marinière, ratatouille, a cassoulet with slow-cooked duck, roasted pork belly, toulouse sausage, coq au vin with wild mushrooms, foie gras, and steak frites. The restaurant has also served foie gras French toast, onion soup with melted gruyere cheese, short rib bourguignon, smoked salmon carpaccio, steak tartare, and a butter lettuce salad with dijon vinaigrette. The drink menu included absinthe cocktails and Old World wine.

History 
Following a few soft-opening dinners, Ox chefs Greg Denton and Gabrielle Quiñónez Denton opened Bistro Agnes on January 18, 2018, in the space which was previously occupied by Grüner.

Named after Greg's grandmother, Bistro Agnes has been described as a "spin-off" of Ox, and replaced the couple's short-lived small plates restaurant SuperBite. According to Daniel P. Smith of FSR magazine, "To reinvent SuperBite as Bistro Agnes, the Dentons toned down the restaurant's existing blue walls, removed a five-seat chef counter, expanded the kitchen to accommodate a walk-in fridge, added track lighting in the dining room, and lowered the height of booths to provide better viewpoints into the restaurant."

Bistro Agnes began serving brunch and lunch in April 2019. The restaurant was affiliated with ChefStable as of 2019. Chase Dopson was a chef at Bistro Agnes.

COVID-19 pandemic and closure 
During the COVID-19 pandemic, the Dentons elected to close the restaurant for an extended period rather than invest tens of thousands of dollars to meet safety regulations. The business continued to owe $6,000 per month in rent during this time, and the owners had hoped to reopen in 2021.

In January 2022, the Dentons confirmed plans to close permanently, saying: "The last two years have been challenging for many restaurants and small businesses, and in this case, we just don't see a path forward without drastically changing the concept to something that is not the restaurant that we built and love. We have turned over the keys to a new set of owners, and as much as it saddens us to no longer be in that space, we are very excited for it to thrive again." 

The cocktail bar Kask, which had operated alongside Grüner, was also sold. Dolly Olive moved into the space previously occupied by Bistro Agnes.

Reception 

In 2018, Michael Russell included Bistro Agnes in The Oregonian lists of Portland's 10 best new restaurants and downtown Portland's 40 best restaurants. He also ranked the restaurant number 31 in the newspaper's 2019 list of the city's 40 best restaurants. Writing for The Globe and Mail, Alyssa Schwartz said "Bistro Agnes is so classically Parisian it almost comes full circle back to edgy." Layla Schlack of Wine Enthusiast recommended Bistro Agnes "for beautifully prepared renditions of French cuisine". Andrea Damewood included the French onion soup in the Portland Mercury's list of "2018's Best Bites from Portland's Best New Restaurants".

Hannah Wallace included Bistro Agnes in Condé Nast Traveler 2018 list of the 21 best restaurants in Portland. She said the restaurant had "classic French comfort food executed with precision" and a "friendly, stylish French bistro" vibe. Wallace said Bistro Agnes offered "Parisian sophistication in PDX" with "affable and attentive" service and "awesome" wines. In 2019, Pete Cottell of Willamette Week recommend the restaurant for "family-style French fare with a modern-American twist". Bistro Agnes ranked fourth in Portland Business Journal 2020 survey of readers' favorite restaurants.

See also

 COVID-19 pandemic in Portland, Oregon
 Impact of the COVID-19 pandemic on the restaurant industry in the United States
 List of defunct restaurants of the United States
 List of French restaurants

References

External links

 

2018 establishments in Oregon
2022 disestablishments in Oregon
Defunct French restaurants in Portland, Oregon
Restaurants disestablished in 2022
Restaurants disestablished during the COVID-19 pandemic
Restaurants established in 2018
Southwest Portland, Oregon